"Elmayı top top yapalım" ("Let's do lumps of apples") is a Turkish folk tune. The tune is a kind of Kaşık Havası, or spoon dance, the original form of which was popular in Hendek. Popular recordings include the version by Ömer Şan & Elvan Erbaşı.

References

External links

</ref>

Turkish music
Turkish songs
Songwriter unknown
Year of song unknown